Tony Bernard Gaiter Jr. (born July 15, 1974) is a former American football wide receiver in the National Football League (NFL) who played for the New England Patriots and San Diego Chargers. He played college football for the Miami Hurricanes. He also played in the XFL for the Orlando Rage.

He played football at Miami Killian Senior High School.

References

1974 births
Living people
American football wide receivers
New England Patriots players
San Diego Chargers players
Orlando Rage players
Miami Hurricanes football players